Euglandina irakita is a species of medium-sized predatory air-breathing land snail, a carnivorous terrestrial pulmonate gastropod mollusk in the family Spiraxidae.

Distribution
This species occurs in the Amazon Rainforest.

References

Spiraxidae
Molluscs of South America
Gastropods described in 2013